Zlatko Krdžević (born 3 December 1959) is a former Serbian footballer, from the 1980s.

Born in Nova Varoš, SR Serbia, he played with FK Sloboda Užice and Red Star Belgrade in the Yugoslav First League, and with AC Bellinzona in Switzerland.

References

External links
 
 forum.b92.net

1959 births
Living people
People from Nova Varoš
Yugoslav footballers
Serbian footballers
Yugoslav First League players
Red Star Belgrade footballers
FK Sloboda Užice players
AC Bellinzona players
Expatriate footballers in Switzerland
Association football defenders